Sean Scott (born September 25, 1978) is a former Arena Football League wide receiver/linebacker for the Philadelphia Soul and Cleveland Gladiators. He went to Millersville University.

High school career
Scott attended Archbishop Carroll High School in Radnor, Pennsylvania and was a star in football and basketball. Sean spent the preseason in 2001 on the Eagles roster.

College career
While attending Millersville University, Scott was a four-year letterman, and a four-time All-PSAC selection. He finished his career as the school's all-time leader in receptions (240), receiving yards (3,293), touchdowns (27).

Professional career
While on the Philadelphia Eagles roster, Scott made the game winning catch from A.J. Feeley against the New York Jets in the preseason finale, earning him Player of the Game honors. Scott did not make the 53-man roster, but spent the rest of the 2001 season on the practice squad. Scott resigned with the Eagles and participated in the 2002 and 2003 Eagles training camps before making his debut in the Arena Football League in 2004 for the Philadelphia Soul. In 2006, while on the Philadelphia Soul, Sean Scott came up 1 yard short of 1,000 yards receiving, and led in his team in Receiving Yards that season.

References

External links
AFL stats
AFL Bio

1978 births
Living people
Sportspeople from Delaware County, Pennsylvania
Players of American football from Pennsylvania
American football linebackers
American football wide receivers
Philadelphia Soul players
Cleveland Gladiators players
Millersville Marauders football players
Archbishop John Carroll High School alumni